was a Japanese actor and director.

He was born in Tokyo. He formerly belonged to Gekidan NLT. He was represented with Come True. His wife was actress Machiko Washio.

Filmography

Stage

Films

TV dramas

Directorial works

Stage

References

External links
 
 
Shu Nakajima – allcinema 
Shu Nakajima – Kinenote 

Japanese male stage actors
Japanese theatre directors
People from Tokyo
1948 births
2017 deaths